Xavier Montsalvatge i Bassols (11 March 1912 – 7 May 2002) was a Spanish composer and music critic. He was one of the most influential music figures in Catalan music during the latter half of the 20th century.

Biography

Life
Montsalvatge was born in Girona, and studied violin and composition at the Barcelona Conservatory. His principal teachers were Lluís Maria Millet, Enric Morera, Jaume Pahissa, and Eduard Toldrà. After the Spanish Civil War, Montsalvatge began work as a music critic when he joined the weekly Destino in 1942, a publication he would eventually direct in 1968 and 1975. He wrote additionally for the daily La Vanguardia after 1962. Montsalvatge also returned to teach at his alma mater, becoming a lecturer in 1970, and then a professor of composition in 1978.
In 1982 he served on the jury of the Paloma O'Shea Santander International Piano Competition.
He was awarded Spain's Premio Nacional de Música for composition in 1985. He died in Barcelona, aged 90, and was buried at the Sant Gervasi Cemetery Barcelona.

Work
Montsalvatge's style evolved over several different phases. At the start of his career, he was strongly influenced by the twelve-tone technique and by Wagnerism, which together dominated the Catalan music scene during the period represented by his Sinfonía mediterránea of 1949. In the following period, he found inspiration in the music of the Antilles (Cinco canciones negras, 1945; Cuarteto indiano, 1952). His steady contact with the French composers Olivier Messiaen and Georges Auric led to a crucial change in his style, which soon became characterized by free polytonality (Partida, 1958).  The final phase of Montsalvatge's work revealed the influence of the avant-garde.

Montsalvatge explored virtually all musical forms in his composition. His work ranges in scale from operas (El gato con botas, Una voz en off) to chamber music (Cuarteto indiano), in between which lie his orchestral works, such as the Desintegración morfológica de la Chacona de Bach, the Laberinto o Sinfonía de réquiem, and the prizewinning Sinfonía mediterránea. He owed his international fame chiefly to one charming and outstanding work: the Cinco canciones negras for mezzo-soprano and orchestra, a blend of Antillean rhythms and themes; among them, the best known is the Canción de cuna para dormir un negrito (Lullaby to sleep a black child).  He wrote film music and in 1987, his score for the picture Dragon Rapide, about Francisco Franco, was nominated as the best original music at the Goya Awards.

Important works

Cinco canciones negras (1945) (Five black songs)
Concerto breve (1953) for piano and orchestra 
Canciones Para Niños (1953) (Songs for Children)
Sonatine pour Ivette (1962) 
Babel (1967) 
Homenaje a Manolo Hugué (1971) 
Serenata a Lydia de Cadaqués (1971) 
Reflexions-obertura (1975) 
Concert capriccio (1975) for harp and orchestra 
Fantasía (1985) for harp and guitar
Simfonia de Rèquiem (1985)
Bric à brac (1993)
"Partita 1958" (1958)
"Euro fanfàrria"

Choral works
Tres canciones negras (1946) for soprano, mixed chorus, and piano

Operas
El gato con botas
Una voce in off
Babel 46 (opera, 2002 premiere)

Ballet
Perlimplinada, music in collaboration with Federico Mompou
Manfred (1945)

Music for cobla ensemble
 Elegia a Juli Garreta (1946)
 Madrigal en forma de sardana (1945)

References

External links
Commemorative website (in Catalan, Spanish, and English)
Peermusic Classical: Xavier Montsalvatge Composer's Publisher and Bio

1912 births
2002 deaths
20th-century classical composers
20th-century Spanish musicians
20th-century Spanish male musicians
Composers from Catalonia
Spanish classical composers
Spanish male classical composers